is a former Japanese football player.

Playing career
Keigoshi was born in Kagoshima Prefecture on September 17, 1963. After graduating from high school, he joined Matsushita Electric (later Gamba Osaka) in 1982. He played many matches as goalkeeper. Although the club played in Prefectural Leagues in 1982, was promoted to Regional Leagues in 1983 and Japan Soccer League in 1984. In 1990, the club won the Emperor's Cup first major title in his club history. In 1992, Japan Soccer League was folded and founded new league J1 League. In 1993, he moved to Verdy Kawasaki. However he could hardly play in the match behind Shinkichi Kikuchi. In 1995, he moved to Japan Football League club Fukuoka Blux (later Avispa Fukuoka). However he could hardly play in the match behind Tomoaki Sano and Hideki Tsukamoto. In 1997, he moved to Kyoto Purple Sanga. However he could not play at all in the match and retired end of 1997 season.

Club statistics

References

External links

sports.geocities.jp

1963 births
Living people
Association football people from Kagoshima Prefecture
Japanese footballers
Japan Soccer League players
J1 League players
Japan Football League (1992–1998) players
Gamba Osaka players
Tokyo Verdy players
Avispa Fukuoka players
Kyoto Sanga FC players
Association football goalkeepers